State Road 348 (NM 348) is a  state highway in the US state of New Mexico. NM 348's northern terminus is at U.S. Route 60 (US 60), US 70 and US 84 in Texico, and the southern terminus is a continuation as North Roosevelt Road A which continues south to NM 202 and Farm to Market Road 1760 (FM 1760).

Major intersections

See also

References

348
Transportation in Roosevelt County, New Mexico
Transportation in Curry County, New Mexico